In category theory, a branch of mathematics, a pullback (also called a fiber product, fibre product, fibered product or Cartesian square) is the limit of a diagram consisting of two morphisms  and  with a common codomain. The pullback is often written

The pullback of two morphisms  and  need not exist, but if it does, it is essentially uniquely defined by the two morphisms. For the general definition, a universal property is used, which essentially expresses the fact that the pullback is the "most general" way to complete the two given morphisms to a commutative square.

The dual concept of the pullback is the pushout.

Universal property

commutes. Moreover, the pullback  must be universal with respect to this diagram.

This situation is illustrated in the following commutative diagram.

As with all universal constructions, a pullback, if it exists, is unique up to isomorphism.

Pullback and product
The pullback is similar to the product, but not the same. One may obtain the product by "forgetting" that the morphisms  and  exist, and forgetting that the object  exists. This discrete category may be used as the index set to construct the ordinary binary product. Thus, the pullback can be thought of as the ordinary (Cartesian) product, but with additional structure.

Examples

Commutative rings

In the category of commutative rings (with identity), the pullback is called the fibered product. Then the pullback of this diagram exists and given by the subring of the product ring  defined by 

along with the morphisms 

 

We then have

Groups and modules 
In complete analogy to the example of commutative rings above, one can show that all pullbacks exist in the category of groups and in the category of modules over some fixed ring.

Sets
In the category of sets, the pullback of functions  and  always exists and is given by the set

Alternatively one may view the pullback in  asymmetrically:

where  is the disjoint union of sets (the involved sets are not disjoint on their own unless  resp.  is injective).

This shows that pullbacks exist in any category with binary products and equalizers. In fact, by the existence theorem for limits, all finite limits exist in a category with binary products and equalizers; equivalently, all finite limits exist in a category with terminal object and pullbacks (by the fact that binary product = pullback on the terminal object, and that an equalizer is a pullback involving binary product).

Fiber bundles
Another example of a pullback comes from the theory of fiber bundles: given a bundle map  and a continuous map , the pullback (formed in the category of topological spaces with continuous maps)  is a fiber bundle over  called the pullback bundle. The associated commutative diagram is a morphism of fiber bundles. This is also the case in the category of differentiable manifolds. A special case is the pullback of two fiber bundles . The pullback of two smooth transverse maps into the same differentiable manifold is also a differentiable manifold, and the tangent space of the pullback is the pullback of the tangent spaces along the differential maps.

Preimages and intersections
Preimages of sets under functions can be described as pullbacks as follows: 

Suppose , . Let  be the inclusion map .

.

Similarly, pullbacks of two monomorphisms can be thought of as the "intersection" of the two subobjects.

Least common multiple
Consider the multiplicative monoid of positive integers  as a category with one object. The same pair is also the pushout.

Properties
In any category with a terminal object , the pullback  is just the ordinary product .
Monomorphisms are stable under pullback: if the arrow  in the diagram is monic, then so is the arrow .
Isomorphisms are also stable, and hence, for example,  for any map  (where the implied map  is the identity).
 In an abelian category all pullbacks exist, and they preserve kernels, in the following sense: if

is a pullback diagram, then the induced morphism  is an isomorphism, and so is the induced morphism . Every pullback diagram thus gives rise to a commutative diagram of the following form, where all rows and columns are exact:

Furthermore, in an abelian category, if  is an epimorphism, then so is its pullback , and symmetrically: if  is an epimorphism, then so is its pullback . In these situations, the pullback square is also a pushout square.

There is a natural isomorphism (A×CB)×B D ≅ A×CD. Explicitly, this means: 
 if maps f : A → C, g : B → C and h : D → B are given and 
 the pullback of f and g is given by r : P → A and s : P → B, and
 the pullback of s and h is given by  t : Q → P and u : Q → D , 
 then the pullback of f and gh is given by rt : Q → A and  u : Q → D. 
Graphically this means that two pullback squares, placed side by side and sharing one morphism, form a larger pullback square when ignoring the inner shared morphism.

 Any category with pullbacks and products has equalizers.

Weak pullbacks 

See also
Pullbacks in differential geometry
Equijoin in relational algebra
Fiber product of schemes

Notes

References
Adámek, Jiří, Herrlich, Horst, & Strecker, George E.; (1990). Abstract and Concrete Categories (4.2MB PDF). Originally publ. John Wiley & Sons. . (now free on-line edition).
Cohn, Paul M.; Universal Algebra (1981), D. Reidel Publishing, Holland,  (Originally published in 1965, by Harper & Row).

External links
Interactive web page which generates examples of pullbacks in the category of finite sets. Written by Jocelyn Paine.
 

Limits (category theory)